Ciraldo is a surname. Notable people with the surname include:

Al Ciraldo (1921–1997), American sportscaster
Bobby Ciraldo (born 1974), American filmmaker and web-based artist
Cameron Ciraldo (born 1984), Australian rugby league player and coach

See also
Giraldo